This is a list of notable people of Bosnia and Herzegovina. The people of Bosnia and Herzegovina are known by the demonym "Bosnians", which includes people belonging to the three main constituent groups (Bosniaks, Croats and Serbs).

Arts

Fine arts

Adi Granov – comic book artist
Braco Dimitrijević – conceptual artist
Endi E. Poskovic – printmaker and artist
Gabrijel Jurkić – painter
Safet Zec – painter and graphic designer
Šejla Kamerić –  video art and installation
Helena Klakocar – cartoonist
Maya Kulenovic – painter (Canada)
Mersad Berber – painter
Nesim Tahirović – painter
Irfan Brkovic – visual artist
Lazar Drljača – painter
Slobodan Pejić – painter and sculptor
Todor Švrakić – painter
Zuko Džumhur – cartoonist
Adela Jušić – visual artist
Florijan Mićković – sculptor

Architecture
Selma Harrington – architect and designer
Vesna Bugarski – Bosnia-Herzegovina's first female architect
Ivan Štraus – architect, academician
Zlatko Ugljen – architect
Hasan Cemalovic – architect
Ivan Ceresnjes – architect
Selman Selmanagić – architect

Composition
Franciscus Bossinensis – composer
Dino Zonić – composer and conductor
Nihad Hrustanbegovic – composier, concert artist, accordionist and pianist 
Elvidin Krilić – musician, accordion player and composer
Miroslav Čangalović – Bosnian opera and concert singer
Lotfi Bouchnak – Tunisian singer, ud player, composer and public figure
Flory Jagoda – composer and singer
Merima Ključo – concert accordionist

Theatre and performing arts
Adnan Hasković – actor
Aleksandra Romanić – pianist
Branko Đurić – actor, director, original member of the cult comedy Top Lista Nadrealista line-up
Davor Dujmović – actor
Enis Bešlagić – actor
Haris Pašović – director
Josip Pejaković – actor
Midhat Ajanović – film theorist, animator and novelist
Mustafa Nadarević – actor
Oskar Danon – composer and conductor
Vedran Smailović – cellist
Vladimir Valjarević – pianist
Zijah Sokolović – actor, director
Zoran Bečić – actor and director
Arijana Marić Gigliani – opera singer
Zlatko Topčić – playwright

Literature

Ivo Andrić – writer, Nobel Laureate
Meša Selimović – writer
Branko Ćopić – writer
Aleksa Šantić – poet
Aleksandar Hemon – writer
Abdulah Sidran – writer
Petar Kočić – writer
Isak Samokovlija – writer
Mak Dizdar – poet
Miljenko Jergović – writer
Semezdin Mehmedinovic – writer
Jovan Dučić – poet
Zaim Topčić – writer
Zlatko Topčić – writer
Prokopije Čokorilo – traveler, writer and historian
Nićifor Dučić – writer
Staka Skenderova – writer

Science and technology
Mahmut Bajraktarević – mathematician
Rifat Hadžiselimović – genetist
Asaf Duraković – physician and expert in nuclear medicine and depleted uranium
Asim Kurjak – physician, gynecologist
Asim Peco – linguist and professor of Philology at the University of Belgrade
Vladimir Prelog – chemist, Nobel Laureate
Irfan Škiljan – creator of freeware image viewer IrfanView

Popular culture

Film, radio and television
Aida Begić – film director
Ademir Kenović – film director and producer François Chalais Prize
Adnan Hasković – actor
Bekim Fehmiu – actor
Danis Tanović – Academy Award, Golden Globe, Berlin Film Festival, Cannes Film Festival-winning director and screenwriter
Haris Pašović – theatre and film director
Emir Kusturica – film director, two time Palme d'Or winner
Hajrudin Krvavac – film director
Harun Mehmedinović – filmmaker, photographer, author
Ivana Miličević – actress, notable appearances in Seinfeld, Felicity, among others
Jasmila Žbanić – film director, Academy Award nominee, BAFTA nominee, 2006 Golden Bear winner
Jasmin Dizdar – film director
Karl Malden – actor, Oscar winner, and the former president of the Academy of Motion Picture Arts and Sciences. His family originates from Bileća.
Nenad Dizdarević – film director
Pjer Žalica – film director
Srđan Vuletić – filmmaker
Tarik Filipović – actor
Vehid Gunić – TV presenter
Zaim Topčić – editor of the Sarajevo radio station
Zlatko Topčić – screenwriter

Music
Adi Lukovac – musician, music producer, founder of band Adi Lukovac & Ornamenti
Alen Islamović – musician, one-time frontman of Divlje Jagode i Bijelo Dugme
Aljoša Buha – member of the original line-up of Crvena Jabuka, killed in a car accident
Alma Čardžić – pop singer
Amila Glamočak – pop singer, represented Bosnia and Herzegovina at the 1994 Eurovision Song Contest
Beba Selimović – sevdalinka singer
Boris Novković – singer and songwriter
Brano Likić – composer and founder of Rezonansa
Dado Džihan – composer, producer, one-time member of Zabranjeno pušenje and Top lista nadrealista
Davor Badrov – singer
Davorin Popović – singer and frontman of Indexi
Deen – former leader of the boyband Seven Up, represented Bosnia and Herzegovina at the 2004 Eurovision Song Contest
Dejan Matić – folk singer
Damir Imamović – sevdalinka singer
Dina Bajraktarević – sevdalinka and folk singer
Dino Merlin – pop singer, songwriter, represented Bosnia and Herzegovina at the 2000 Eurovision Song Contest
DJ Krmak – singer
Dražen Ričl a.k.a. Zijo – original frontman for Crvena Jabuka
Dražen Žerić a.k.a. Žera – original member of Crvena Jabuka and its current frontman
 Duško Kuliš – folk singer
Edo Maajka – rapper, leader of rap group Disciplinska komisija
Elvir Laković Laka, rock music singer, songwriter
Esad Plavi – pop-folk singer
Goran Bregović – musician and composer, founder of Bijelo Dugme
Hakala – folk singer
Halid Bešlić – folk singer
Hanka Paldum – sevdalinka singer
Haris Džinović – folk singer
Hajrudin Varešanović – a.k.a. Hari Mata Hari pop singer and songwriter, represented Bosnia and Herzegovina at the 2006 Eurovision Song Contest finishing third
Himzo Polovina – sevdalinka singer
Igor Vukojević – singer
Indira Radić – folk singer
Jadranka Stojaković – pop singer
Jasmin Muharemović – pop-folk singer
Jura Stublić – rock singer
Kemal Malovčić – popular Bosnian etno-psyhodelic singer
Kemal Monteno – singer, musician, and songwriter
Kornelije Kovač – composer, musician, member of the original line-up of Indexi, founder of Korni grupa
Lepa Brena – pop-folk singer
Marinko Rokvić – folk singer
Mate Bulić – pop-folk singer
Maya Berović – pop star
Meho Puzić – sevdalinka-folk singer
Mile Kitić – turbofolk singer
Miloš Bojanić – pop-folk singer
Mirsada Bajraktarević – singer
Mitar Mirić – singer 
Mladen Vojičić Tifa – singer
Nada Mamula – sevdalinka singer
Nada Topčagić  – singer
Nadja Benaissa – singer
Nedeljko Bajić Baja – singer
Nenad Janković – musician, original frontman of Zabranjeno pušenje, original member of the Top lista nadrealista line-up
Nikša Bratoš – composer, producer, one-time member of Rezonansa and Valentino, member of Crvena Jabuka
Nino Rešić – singer
Osman Hadžić – folk singer
Safet Isović – sevdalinka singer
Sanja Maletić – pop-folk singer
Saša Lošić – singer, composer and founder of the Plavi orkestar band
Saša Matić – folk singer
Sead Lipovača – original member of Divlje Jagode
Sejo Sexon, – founder of Zabranjeno pušenje and current frontman of the Zagreb-based post-war line-up
Seka Aleksić – pop-folk singer
Selma Bajrami – folk singer
Šemsa Suljaković, folk singer
Šerif Konjević – folk singer
Silvana Armenulić, folk and sevdalinka singer
Tifa – singer and musician
Tomo Miličević – guitarist for Thirty Seconds to Mars
Vesna Pisarović – pop singer
Vladimir Savčić Čobi – singer
Zaim Imamović – sevdalinka singer
Zdravko Čolić – pop singer
Željko Bebek – musician and singer
Željko Samardžić – pop-rock singer

Politicians and historical figures

Medieval

14th century Vojvoda Bogut – first known ancestor of the House of Petrović-Njegoš, royal Family of Montenegro, ruler of Jablan Grad, near present-day Ugljevik, Bosnia and Herzegovina
14th century Đurađ Bogutović – son of Vojvoda Bogut and the 14th century nobleman, grandfather of Herak Heraković, the founding father of the Petrović-Njegoš and Heraković-Popović families of the Njeguši tribe
1154–1163 Ban Borić
Hrvoje Vukčić Hrvatinić – Bosnian Duke, founder of the town of Jajce
1172–1204 Ban Kulin
1204–1232 Stjepan Kulinić
1232–1253 Matej Ninoslav
1254–1287 Prijezda I
1287–1290 Prijezda II
1267–1313 Stjepan I Kotromanić
1314–1353 Stjepan II Kotromanić
1353–1366 & 1367–zaljke 

1391 Tvrtko I of Bosnia
1366–1367 Stjepan Vuk
1391–1395 Stephen Dabiša of Bosnia
1398–1404 & 1409–1418 Stephen Ostoja of Bosnia
1404–1409 & 1421–1433 & 1435–1442 Tvrtko II of Bosnia
1433–1435 Radivoj Ostojić 
1443–1461 Stephen Thomas
1461–1463 Stephen Tomašević
 Elizabeth of Bosnia
 Dorothea of Bulgaria
 Dorothy Garai
 Jelena Gruba
 Jelena Nelipčić
 Katarina Kosača
 Kujava
 Mary of Serbia
 Vitača
Sandalj Hranić, Sandalj Hranić Kosača, 1370–1435, medieval nobleman from the House of Kosača.
Stjepan Vukčić Kosača a.k.a. Duke of Saint Sava, Herceg Stjepan Kosača, Vojvoda of Hum (Herzegovina) – father of Bosnian Queen, Katarina Kosača Kotromanić
Vlatko Vuković, Vlatko Vuković Kosača, died 1392, medieval nobleman from the House of Kosača

Ottoman rule 1463–1878
Gazi Husrev-beg – military strategist and the greatest donor and builder of Sarajevo
Husein Gradaščević a.k.a. Husein-kapetan, The Dragon of Bosnia – 19th century Bosnian nobleman and autonomy fighter
Isa-Beg Isaković – general, first governor of the Ottoman province of Bosnia, and founder of the cities of Sarajevo and Novi Pazar
Ivan Franjo Jukić
Ferhad Pasha Sokolović – founder and designer of Banja Luka old town
Mehmed Paša Sokolović a.k.a. Sokollu Mehmet Paşa – Grand Vizier to Suleyman the Magnificent and Selim II
Damad Ibrahim Pasha – Grand Vizier
Tiryaki Hasan Pasha a.k.a. Hasan-Paša Tiro – Bosnian national hero
Osman Pazvantoğlu – Bosnia Ottoman soldier, a governor of the Vidin district after 1794, and a rebel against Ottoman rule.

Austro-Hungarian occupation 1878–1918
Gavrilo Princip – member of black hand, Serb, and assassin of Archduke Franz Ferdinand, This assassination triggered World War I.

Kingdom of Yugoslavia 1918–1941
David Elazar – Chief of staff of the Israeli Defence Forces
Džemaludin Čaušević – Reis-ul-ulema
Mehmed Spaho – leader of the Yugoslavia Muslim Organisation

World War II
Peter Tomich – World War II hero
Rodoljub Čolaković – World War II war hero, People's Hero of Yugoslavia

Socialist Federal Republic of Yugoslavia 1943–1991

Presidents of the Socialist Republic of Bosnia and Herzegovina 1943–1990
Kecmanović, Vojislav Đedo – (25 November 1943 – November 1946)
Pucar, Đuro Stari – (November 1946 – September 1948)
Šegrt, Vlado – (September 1948 – March 1953)
Pucar, Đuro Stari – (December 1953 – June 1963)
Dugonjić, Rato – (June 1963 – 1967)
Bijedić, Džemal – (1967–1971)
Pozderac, Hamdija – (1971 – May 1974)
Dugonjić, Rato – (May 1974 – April 1978)
Dizdarević, Raif – (April 1978 – April 1982)
Mikulić, Branko – (April 1982 – 26 April 1984)
Renovica, Milanko – (26 April 1984 – 26 April 1985.)
Mesihović, Munir – (26 April 1985 – April 1987)
Andrić, Mato – (April 1988 – April 1989)
Filipović, Nikola – (April 1988 – April 1989)
Piljak, Obrad – (April 1989 – December 1990)

Prime ministers of Bosnia and Herzegovina 1945–1990
Čolaković, Rodoljub – (27 April 1945 – September 1948)
Pucar, Đuro Stari – (September 1948 – December 1953)
Humo, Avdo – (December 1953 – 1956)
Karabegović, Osman – (1956–1963)
Brkić, Hasan – (1963–1965)
Kolak, Rudi – (1965–1967)
Mikulić, Branko – (1967–1969)
Kosovac, Dragutin – (1969 – April 1974)
Renovica, Milanko – (April 1974 – 28 April 1982)
Maglajlija, Seid – (28 April 1982 – 28 April 1984)
Ubiparip, Gojko – (28 April 1984 – April 1986)
Lovrenović, Josip – (April 1986 – April 1988)

Bosnia presidents since 1990
Alija Izetbegović – (December 1990 – October 1996) (collective presidency chairman)
Alija Izetbegović (October 1996 – October 1998) (collective presidency chairman)
Živko Radišić – (October 1998 – June 1999)
Ante Jelavić – (June 1999 – February 2000)
Alija Izetbegović – (February 2000 – October 2000)
Živko Radišić – (October 2000 – June 2001)
Jozo Križanović – (June 2001 – February 2002)
Beriz Belkić – (February 2002 – October 2002)
Mirko Šarović – (October 2002 – April 2003)
Borislav Paravac – (April 2003 – June 2003)
Dragan Čović – (June 2003 – February 2004)
Sulejman Tihić – (February 2004 – October 2004)
Borislav Paravac – (October 2004 – June 2005)
Ivo Miro Jović – (June 2005 – October 2006)
Nebojša Radmanović – (part of collective presidency)
Željko Komšić – (part of collective presidency)(collective presidency chairman)
Haris Silajdžić – (part of collective presidency)

Other political figures since 1943
Adnan Terzić – politician, former Prime Minister of Bosnia and Herzegovina
Boris Tadić – President of the Republic of Serbia
Cvijetin Mijatović a.k.a. Majo – politician and one-time President of the Collective Presidency of the SFR Yugoslavia
Irfan Ljubijankić – surgeon, composer, politician and diplomat
Jovan Divjak – general of the Army of the Republic of Bosnia and Herzegovina during the 1992–1995 war, poet
Mladen Ivanić – politician and diplomat
Nikola Špirić – politician, Prime Minister of Bosnia and Herzegovina
Stjepan Šiber – Deputy Commander of the B&H Army during the 1992–1995 conflict
Vladimir Dedijer – Partisan fighter, politician, and historian
Zlatko Lagumdžija – politician and diplomat
Zoran Đinđić – prime minister of the Republic of Serbia, Mayor of Belgrade, and the philosopher

Sportspeople

Team sports
Basketball

Adnan Hodžić – basketball player
Aleksandar Nikolić – "Father of Yugoslav Basketball"
Anđa Jelavić – basketball player
Bogdan Tanjević – basketball coach
Borislav Stanković – former basketball player
Damir Omerhodžić-Markota – NBA basketball player with the Milwaukee Bucks
Damir Mršić – former basketball player
Damir Mulaomerović – retired basketball player
Dejan Bodiroga – voted first on the list by the fans worldwide for the Euroleague Basketball 2001–2010 All-Decade Team. His family originates from the village of Bodiroge near Trebinje
Dragana Stanković – basketball player
Dražen Dalipagić – basketball player, former Real Madrid player, Olympic medalist and FIBA Hall of Famer
Džanan Musa – basketball player
Emir Mutapčić – assistant coach of FC Bayern Munich and current coach of the German national team
Edin Bavčić – former NBA basketball player with the Philadelphia 76ers
Elmedin Kikanović – basketball player
Jasmin Repeša – basketball coach
Jelica Komnenović – former basketball player
Jusuf Nurkić – basketball player
Mile Ilić – former basketball player
Mirza Delibašić – basketball player, former Bosna and Real Madrid player, Olympic medalist and FIBA Hall of Famer
Bojan Bogdanović – basketball player (born in Mostar), former Real Madrid player
Mirza Teletović – NBA basketball player the Brooklyn Nets
Nedžad Sinanović – basketball player
Nenad Marković – basketball coach and former basketball player
Nihad Đedović – basketball player with Bayern Munich
Predrag Danilović – basketball coach and former basketball player
Razija Mujanović – former basketball player
Robert Rothbart (born as Boris Kajmaković in 1986) – Bosnian-Israeli-American basketball player
Saša Čađo – basketball player
Slađana Golić – former basketball player
Tima Džebo – former basketball player
Vesna Bajkuša – former basketball player
Vladimir Radmanović – NBA basketball player with the Los Angeles Lakers
Zoran Planinić – NBA basketball player
Zoran Savić – former basketball player
Kornelija Kvesić – former basketball player
Mara Lakić – former basketball player
Mersada Bećirspahić – former basketball player

Football
Ivica Osim – football coach and former footballer
Safet Sušić – football coach and former footballer, Paris Saint-Germain and Ligue 1 great
Josip Katalinski – former football player
Asim Ferhatović – former football player
Dušan Bajević – football coach and former player
Vahid Halilhodžić – football coach and former footballer
Enver Marić – former football goalkeeper
Faruk Hadžibegić – former football player
Blaž Slišković – football coach and former footballer
Meho Kodro – former football player
Sergej Barbarez – football player
Elvir Baljić – football player
Elvir Bolić – football player
Emir Spahić – football player
Edin Džeko – Manchester City (on loan to Roma) and Bosnia national team
Vedad Ibišević – football player
Asmir Begović – football goalkeeper
Boro Primorac – football coach
Edin Višća – football player
Elvir Rahimić – football player
Franjo Vladić – former footballer
Muhamed Konjić – former footballer
Vahidin Musemić – former football player
Gradimir Crnogorac – football player
Haris Medunjanin – football player
Haris Škoro – former football player
Hasan Salihamidžić – former Bayern Munich midfielder and second Bosnian to win Champions League
Ibrahim Duro – former football player
Izet Hajrović – football player
Mario Stanić – former footballer
Mehmed Baždarević – former footballer
Mensur Mujdža – football player
Miroslav Blažević – football coach
Mirsad Fazlagić – former football player
Miralem Pjanić – Juventus and Bosnia national team
Muhamed Mujić – former footballer
Mirsad Hibić – former footballer
Predrag Pašić – football coach, former player
Safet Nadarević – football player
Sead Sušić – football player
Saša Papac – football player
Savo Milošević – football player
Sead Kolašinac – football player
Sejad Salihović – football player
Senijad Ibričić – football player
Zlatan Bajramović – football player
Darko Maletić – football player
Zvjezdan Misimović – football player
Sulejman Halilović – former football player
Tarik Hodžić – footballer
Tomislav Piplica – former football player

Foreign footballers of Bosnian origin

– Australia national team
Eli Babalj – forward for Adelaide United and the Australia national team
Dino Djulbic – defender for Perth Glory and formerly the Australia national team

– Austria national team
Marko Arnautović – striker Stoke City and Austria national team
Zlatko Junuzovic – midfielder SV Werder Bremen and Austria national tean

– Croatia national team
Alen Halilović – midfielder and Croatia national team
Ante Ćorić – midfielder and Croatia national team
Boris Živković – defender and Croatia national team
Davor Šuker – retired Croatia national team striker
Darijo Srna – midfielder and Croatia national team (Bosnia father)
Dejan Lovren – defender and Croatia national team
Goran Jurić – defender and Croatia national team
Ivan Klasnić – striker Nantes and Croatia national team
Ivan Rakitić – midfielder Sevilla and Croatia national team
Jerko Leko – midfielder and Croatia national team
Josip Šimunić – defender and Croatia national team
Krunoslav Jurčić – defensive midfielder and Croatia national team
Mario Mandžukić – striker Bayern Munich and Croatia national team
Mario Stanić – retired midfielder Chelsea F.C. and Croatia national team
Mario Tokić – defender and Croatia national team
Mateo Kovačić – midfielder and Croatia national team
Mato Neretljak – defender and Croatia national team
Mladen Petrić – striker West Ham United and Croatia national team
Niko Kovač – midfielder and Croatia national team
Nikica Jelavić – striker Hull and Croatia national team
Robert Kovač – defender and Croatia national team
Stjepan Tomas – defender and Croatia national team
Tin Jedvaj – defender and Croatia national team
Vedran Ćorluka – defender Lokomotiv Moscow and Croatia national team
Zoran Mamić – defensive midfielder and Croatia national team

– Germany national team
Marko Marin – midfielder Sevilla and Germany national team

– Serbia national team
Luka Jović – striker Real Madrid and Serbia national team
Mladen Krstajić – defender Schalke 04 and Serbia national team
Neven Subotić – defender Borrusia Dortmund and Serbia national team
Ognjen Koroman – midfielder Red Star Belgrade and Serbia national team
Savo Milošević – retired Serbia national team striker
Zdravko Kuzmanović – midfielder AC Fiorentina and Serbia national team

– Slovenia national team
Armin Bačinović – midfielder Palermo and Slovenia national team
Zlatan Ljubijankić – retired striker and Slovenia national team
Jasmin Kurtič – midfielder Sassuolo and Slovenia national team
Mirnes Šišić – midfielder Olympiacos and Slovenia national team
Samir Handanovič – goalkeeper Inter Milan and Slovenia national team
Josip Iličić – midfielder Fiorentina and Slovenia national team
Haris Vučkić – midfielder Newcastle United and Slovenia national team

– Sweden national team
Zlatan Ibrahimović – striker Paris Saint-Germain and Sweden national team

– Switzerland national team
Eldin Jakupović – goalkeeper Hull City and Switzerland national team
Haris Seferovic – striker Real Sociedad and Switzerland national team

Handball
Adnan Harmandić – handball player for HSG Wetzlar
Abas Arslanagić – former handball player, gold medal at the 1972 Summer Olympics
Benjamin Burić – handball player
Bilal Šuman – handball player
Danijel Šarić – goalkeeper for FC Barcelona Handbol
Enid Tahirović – former handball goalkeeper 
Ermin Velić – former handball player, bronze medal at the 1980 Summer Olympics
Jasna Kolar-Merdan – IHF World Player of the Year 1990
Ćamila Mičijević – handball player for Croatia national team
Irfan Smajlagić – former handball player, gold medal at the 1996 Summer Olympics
Mirko Alilović – goalkeeper plays for Croatia national team
Mirsad Terzić – handball player, captain of Bosnia national team
Mirza Džomba – handball player, Olympic and World champion
Muhamed Memić – handball player, World champion
Muhamed Mustafić – handball player
Muhamed Toromanović – handball player
Svetlana Dašić-Kitić – best female handball player ever by International Handball Federation
Zlatan Arnautović –  former handball player (Olympic Gold Medal 1984)

Volleyball
Tijana Bošković, Serbia national team player, Olympic medalist
Đorđe Đurić, Serbia national team player, Olympic medalist
Brankica Mihajlović, Serbia national team player, Olympic medalist
Jelena Blagojević, Serbia national team player
Aleksandar Okolić, Serbia national team player
Adis Lagumdžija, Turkish national team player
Meliha Smajlović, Turkey national team player
Sanja Starović, Serbia national team player
Saša Starović, Serbia national team player

Water polo
Milan Muškatirović
Veselin Đuho
Zoran Janković

Individual sports
Athletics
Amel Tuka – middle-distance runner
Ana Šimić – high jumper
Borisav Pisić – hurdler
Branko Dangubić – javelin thrower
Dako Radošević – discus thrower
Dragan Perić – shot putter
Elvir Krehmić – high jumper
Filip Mihaljević – shot putter
Hamza Alić – shot putter
Ivan Ivančić – shot putter
Sejad Krdžalić – javelin thrower
Zlatan Saračević – shot putter

Chess
Ivan Sokolov – chess player, Grandmaster since 1987
Predrag Nikolić – chess player, Grandmaster since 1983
Bojan Kurajica – chess player, Grandmaster
Borki Predojević – grandmaster, top Bosnia chess player

Martial arts/boxing

Anton Josipović – boxing, light heavyweight gold medal at the 1984 Summer Olympics
Marijan Beneš – boxing, gold medal at the 1973 European Championship
Tomislav Krizmanić – boxing, bronze medal at the 1953 European Championship
Memnun Hadžić – boxing, bronze medal at the 2008 European championship 
Hamid Guska – boxing coach
Almedin Fetahović – boxing
Adnan Ćatić – boxing, reigning IBF world champion, former WBO champion, and a two time former WBA champion
Jasmin Hasić – super heavyweight boxing best known for winning Bronze Medal at the European Junior Championships 2007 in Sombor
Mirsad Bektić – mixed martial artist
Amer Hrustanović – wrestler
Amel Mekić – judo, European champion
Larisa Cerić – judo, European championship medalist
Davor Vlaškovac – judo, European championship medalist
Zoran Prerad – taekwondo, European champion
Nedžad Husić – taekwondo, 5th place at the 2020 Summer Olympics 
Arnela Odžaković – karate, two silver medals at the European Championships
Dževad Poturak – retired super heavyweight kickboxer and former WKA European Champion and K-1 Fighting Network Prague 2007 tournament Champion

Tennis
Alexandros Jakupovic – tennis player (Bosnia father)
Amer Delić – tennis player
Ivan Dodig – tennis player
Ivan Ljubičić – tennis player
Marin Čilić – tennis player
Mervana Jugić-Salkić – tennis player
Sandra Martinović – tennis player
Damir Džumhur – tennis player
Andrea Petkovic – tennis player, playing for Germany

Other
Lana Pudar, swimmer
Almir Velagić, weightlifter
Nedžad Fazlija, sports shooter
Andrea Arsović, sports shooter
Bojan Tokič, table tennis player
Jasna Fazlić, table tennis player
Michi Halilović, skeleton racer
Milenko Zorić, canoer
Radoje Đerić, rower
Dino Beganovic, racing driver
Srećko Pejović, sports shooter
Velimir Stjepanović, swimmer
Veselin Petrović, cyclist

Religion
Makarije Sokolović, Serbia Patriarch (s. 1557–1571)
Antonije Sokolović, Serbia Patriarch (s. 1571–1575)
Gerasim Sokolović, Serbia Patriarch (s. 1575–1586)
Savatije Sokolović, Serbian Patriarch (s. 1587)
Gavrilo II, Serbia Patriarch (s. 1752)
Basil of Ostrog (1610–1671), Orthodox bishop of Zahumlje
Visarion, Orthodox metropolitan of Herzegovina (s. 1590–1602)
Savatije Ljubibratić, Orthodox metropolitan of Zahumlje and Dalmatia (s. 1693–1716)
Nićifor Dučić (1832–1900), Orthodox theologian, historian, philologist and writer
Jovica Ilić (fl. 1834–), Orthodox priest, rebel leader
Pavle Tvrtković (fl. 1834–51), Orthodox priest, served at the Serbia court

Other prominent people
Adil Zulfikarpašić – businessman, one-time politician, and philanthropist, founder of the Bosniak Institute in Sarajevo
Alija Sirotanović – Bosnia coal-miner, worker-hero, his face was on the 10 and 20000 dinar banknotes
Boris Tadić – President of Serbia
Branko Crvenkovski – Prime Minister of the Republic of Macedonia from 1992 to 1998 and again from 2002 to 2004, then President of the Republic of Macedonia from 2004 to 2009.
Emerik Blum – founder of Energoinvest, former Mayor of Sarajevo, arguably the most successful and influential businessman in the history of Bosnia and Herzegovina
Fikret Hodžić – Bosnia bodybuilder
Kemal Curić – automobile designer known best for his work at Ford, where he was responsible for numerous concept and production cars
Inga Peulich – Australia politician born in Bosnia and Herzegovina
Omer Halilhodžić – automobile designer responsible for the styling of the 2004 Mitsubishi Colt, and the concept cars which preceded it: CZ2, CZ3, CZ3 cabriolet, and CZT. He has since penned the Mitsubishi Concept Sportback, and the Mitsubishi Concept X, which presages the Mitsubishi Lancer Evolution X production car.
Mila Mulroney – wife of the 18th Prime Minister of Canada Brian Mulroney
Tijana Arnautović – model, Miss World Canada 2004
Vladimir Ćorović – historian
Zoran Đinđić – former Prime Minister of Serbia
Nijaz Ibrulj – philosopher and professor at the University of Sarajevo
Faruk Čaklovica – Professor of Bromatology and Rector of the University of Sarajevo
Željko Topić – Croatia civil servant and Vice-President of the European Patent Office born in Bosnia and Herzegovina
Semir Osmanagić – Bosnia author, businessman and pseudoarchaeologist

Infamous people
Andrija Artuković – minister in the government of the Independent State of Croatia and war criminal
Ante Pavelić – Ustaše leader, founder and leader of the fascist Independent State of Croatia, war criminal
Biljana Plavšić – politician, convicted by the International War Tribunal for war crimes during the Bosnian war
Vjekoslav Luburić – Ustaše leader, commander of the Jasenovac concentration camp, war criminal
Miroslav Filipović – Ustaše leader, commander of the Jasenovac concentration camp, and war criminal
Momčilo Krajišnik – politician, convicted by the International War Tribunal for war crimes and ethnic cleansing during the Bosnian war
Radovan Karadžić – political leader of the Serbs during 1992–1995, indicted by the International War Tribunal for war crimes and genocide, most wanted man in Europe
Ratko Mladić – General of the Serbia Army during 1992–1995, indicted by the International War Tribunal for war crimes and genocide, most wanted man in Europe alongside Karadžić
Tihomir Blaškić – convicted of violating the laws of war, committing ethnic cleansing and crimes against humanity during the Bosnian war
Vojislav Šešelj – politician, radical extremist, Chetnik leader, indicted by the International War Tribunal for war crimes, ethnic cleansing, and crimes against humanity during the Bosnian war

See also
List of Bosniaks
List of Croats
List of Serbs
Demographic history of Bosnia and Herzegovina

References